was a Japanese manga artist, best known as the illustrator of Lady Snowblood, which was adapted into film in 1973. Hitoshi Iwaaki, a manga artist was his assistant.

Kamimura died at age 45 of a pharynx tumor.

References

External links 
 Kamimura Kazuo Official Site
 
 Lambiek Comiclopedia page.

1940 births
1986 deaths
Manga artists
People from Yokosuka, Kanagawa